"Jealous Guy" is a song written and originally recorded by English rock musician John Lennon from his 1971 album Imagine. Not released as a single during Lennon's lifetime, it became an international hit in a version by Roxy Music issued in early 1981; this version reached #1 in the UK and Australia, and was a top 10 hit in several European countries.  Lennon's own version was subsequently issued as a single, and charted in the US and UK.

Lennon began writing the song in 1968, when, as "Child of Nature", it was among the many songs demoed by the Beatles before they recorded their self-titled double album (also known as the "White Album"). The lyrics were originally inspired by a lecture given by Maharishi Mahesh Yogi in early 1968, when the Beatles attended his spiritual retreat in Rishikesh, India. In January 1969, The Beatles (primarily John) jammed the song during their Get Back / Let It Be recording sessions, where it was referred to as "On the Road to Marrakesh".
Listening to the original "Child of Nature" (Esher Demo) the song clearly begins "On the road to Rishikesh" and continues mentioning mountains. It is not referring to Marrakesh in Morocco. There is no evidence John ever went there.
In its rewritten form, the song serves as a confessional in which Lennon addresses the feelings of inadequacy that resulted in pain for those he loved.

"Jealous Guy" is one of the most commonly recorded Lennon songs, with at least 92 cover versions.

Origins 

The song's inspiration came in India, after the Beatles attended a lecture by Maharishi Mahesh Yogi about a "son of the mother nature". This inspired both Paul McCartney and John Lennon to write songs about the same subject. McCartney's composition, "Mother Nature's Son", was selected for The Beatles, but Lennon did not attempt to record "Child of Nature" during the sessions for the album. Both were demoed at George Harrison's Esher home in May 1968. The demo of "Child of Nature" featured Lennon's double-tracked vocal and playing an acoustic guitar. Early the following year, Lennon revisited the song as "On the Road to Marrakesh" during the Get Back sessions. Eventually, the lyrics were scrapped and replaced by the now well-known "Jealous Guy" lyrics for Imagine.

Three recordings of "Child of Nature" are currently known. The first is a demo of the song recorded at the home of George Harrison in May 1968. The second, on which Harrison sings backing vocals, was recorded at Twickenham Film Studios on 2 January 1969. A third recording was made at the Beatles' Apple Studio on 24 January. A snatch of the chorus from the second recording appears on the Fly on the Wall bonus disc packaged with Let It Be... Naked (2003). The first recording appears on the fiftieth anniversary release of The Beatles, which contains all of the demos recorded at Esher.

Recording
Lennon recorded "Jealous Guy" on 24 May 1971 at Ascot Sound Studios, where his vocals were overdubbed on 29 May 1971. String overdubs took place on 4 July 1971 at the Record Plant, in New York City. Musicians included Mike Pinder of the Moody Blues and Joey Molland and Tom Evans of Badfinger.

Release
Lennon's recording of "Jealous Guy" was released on the Imagine album in 1971. It was not released as a single until November 1985, five years after Lennon's murder, and four-and-a-half years after Roxy Music had taken their cover of the song to number one. Accompanied on the B-side by "Going Down on Love", a track from Walls and Bridges (1974), the single reached number 65 in the UK charts.

In the United States, the single reached number 80 on the Billboard Hot 100 in November 1988, in conjunction with the release of the film Imagine: John Lennon. "Jealous Guy" also peaked at number 22 on the Hot Adult Contemporary chart.

Reception
Ultimate Classic Rock critic Stephen Lewis rated it as Lennon's 3rd greatest solo love song, calling it "one of his most mature piano melodies."

Personnel 
The following musicians performed on the final track on Imagine:

 John Lennon – vocals, acoustic guitar, whistling
 Nicky Hopkins – piano
 John Barham – harmonium
 Alan White – vibraphone
 Klaus Voormann – bass
 Jim Keltner – drums
 Mike Pinder – tambourine
 Joey Molland and Tom Evans – acoustic guitars
 The Flux Fiddlers – strings

Promotional video 

A promotional video was made for the song in 1971. It showed, mostly in a continuous overhead shot by helicopter, John and Yoko travelling in a hearse from their Tittenhurst Park mansion to a nearby lake, where they were then shown getting into a row boat.

Other versions
"Jealous Guy" has been recorded by many musicians including Aslan, Joe Cocker, Roberto Bellarosa, Donny Hathaway, Claudine Longet, the Faces, Frankie Miller, Roxy Music, Belinda Carlisle, Peter Criss, Deftones, and indie-band Spector. Lou Reed covered the song for a 2001 Lennon tribute concert. Jazz musician Jimmy Scott covered Jealous Guy on his 1998 album Holding Back the Years. The rock band the Black Crowes released a live cover of Jealous Guy on the 30th anniversary release of their 1990 album Shake Your Money Maker.

Roxy Music version

Following Lennon's murder in 1980, Roxy Music added a version of the song to their set while touring in Germany, which they recorded and released in February 1981. The single was released by Polydor with "To Turn You On" as the B-side, with catalogue number "ROXY 2". The song was the only UK No. 1 hit for Roxy Music, topping the charts for two weeks in March 1981.
"To Turn You On" later appeared on the 1982 album Avalon, although it was slightly remixed. Roxy Music's cover of "Jealous Guy" features on many Bryan Ferry/Roxy Music collections and 1980s music compilations, though not always in its full-length version. As of 1982, the single had sold 91,000 copies in Australia.

Charts

Weekly charts

Year-end charts

Music video 

A music video was filmed for the song, which mainly consisted of Bryan Ferry singing to camera before whistling and playing on a Sequential Circuits Prophet-5 synthesizer during the coda. Guitarist Phil Manzanera and saxophonist Andy Mackay also appear in the video during their respective solos.

Roberto Bellarosa version 

In 2012, Belgian singer of Italian origin Roberto Bellarosa recorded "Jealous Guy" after winning the first season of The Voice Belgique. It was released as a single on 4 April 2012 and included on his debut album Ma voie. The single reached number 4 in Belgium.

References 

1971 songs
1985 singles
Parlophone singles
John Lennon songs
Songs written by John Lennon
Song recordings produced by Phil Spector
Song recordings produced by John Lennon
Song recordings produced by Yoko Ono
The Beatles and India
1981 singles
Roxy Music songs
Polydor Records singles
Apple Records singles
E.G. Records singles
UK Singles Chart number-one singles
Number-one singles in Australia
2012 singles
Sony Music singles
Rock ballads
Pop ballads
1970s ballads
British soft rock songs